Henry Robb, Limited, known colloquially as Robbs, was a Scottish shipbuilding company based at Leith Docks in Edinburgh. Robbs was notable for building small-to-medium sized vessels, particularly tugs and dredgers.

History
The company was founded on 1 April 1918 by Henry Robb, a former yard manager for Ramage & Ferguson shipbuilders, who lay around 1 km to the east.
Robb was born in Partick, Glasgow in 1874 to Henry Robb (1843-1894), a ships caulker, and his wife Martha Simpson (1840–78).  He married Mary Baird Mcintosh Cowan in 1903 and their son, Henry Cowan Robb (1932-2018), became a Director of the firm.   Henry Robb died in Edinburgh in 1951.

Robbs grew by buying berths from Hawthorns in 1924, the business of Cran and Somerville in 1926 and the yards of Ramage and Ferguson in 1934. The site became known as Victoria Shipyard.

Robbs closed its Arbroath and Clyde operations in the 1920s and focused its activities on Leith.

During World War II, Robbs built a large number of naval warships for the Royal Navy, including preparing the designs and building the prototype of the  anti-submarine / minesweeping trawler. Three  corvettes were built for the Royal New Zealand Navy.

On 26 February 1940 King George VI and Queen Elizabeth toured the shipyard.

In 1968 Robbs merged with the Caledon Shipbuilding & Engineering Company of Dundee, forming Robb Caledon Shipbuilding, and in 1969 the new company took over the Burntisland Shipbuilding Company in Fife. In 1977, under the provisions of the Aircraft and Shipbuilding Industries Act 1977, Robb Caledon was nationalised as part of British Shipbuilders. The Caledon yard in Dundee closed in 1981. Robb's yard in Leith survived two more years, closing in 1983.

The site of Robb's shipyard is now the Ocean Terminal shopping centre, where the Royal Yacht Britannia is berthed. An early 20th-century pitched roof paint shed that once belonged to the yard, built from rivetted iron plates, survives and was a Category B listed building before being relocated.

The yard features in the video to the song "Letter From America" (1987) by The Proclaimers, whose father worked in the yard. The overall sentiment of the song stresses the loss of Scotland's traditional industries and the mass emigration of Scots to North America due to circumstances such as the Highland Clearances.

Ships built by Robbs

Naval
s
 
 
 
 
 
 

s
 
 
 

s
 
 
 

s
 
 
 
  (ex- HMS Glenarm)
 
 
 HMS Naver – cancelled and re-ordered as HMS Loch Achanalt.

s
  – to Royal Canadian Navy on completion.
  – to Royal Malaysian Navy in 1964 as Hang Tuah.
  – to Royal New Zealand Navy in 1949 as Rotoiti.
 three further ships of this class – Loch Kishorn, Loch Nell and Loch Odairn – were cancelled.

s
  (ex- HMS Loch Laxford)
  (ex- HMS Loch Maddy)
  (ex- HMS Loch Coulside)

Royal Fleet Auxiliary ships
  – naval stores ship
  – aviation training ship
  – naval stores ship

Bustler-class ocean rescue tugs
 
 
 
 
 
 
 
 

 

Wild Duck-class RMAS cable-laying and salvage ships

Merchant

References

External links
 The Ships of Henry Robb
 The Loftsman, history of the ships built at Leith
 Photos of the closed Robbs yard at edinphoto.org.uk
 Photos of Robb Caledon built ships at shipphotos.co.uk
 History of the Free French frigate La Découverte, ex-HMS Windrush
 Blog about the history of Robb's yard and workers by Henry Robb's great-granddaughter

1918 establishments in Scotland
Manufacturing companies based in Edinburgh
Manufacturing companies established in 1918
Defunct shipbuilding companies of Scotland
Former defence companies of the United Kingdom
History of Leith
1983 disestablishments in Scotland
Manufacturing companies disestablished in 1983
Naval trawlers
British companies disestablished in 1983
British companies established in 1918
British Shipbuilders